Ningomba Engson Singh (born 2 January 2003) is an Indian professional footballer who plays as a midfielder for Indian Super League club ATK Mohun Bagan.

Club career
Born in Manipur, Singh began his career at Birchandra Memorial Sporting Club before joining the youth system at ATK. He was announced as part of the first-team for ATK Mohun Bagan prior to their 2020–21 season.

On 6 February 2021, Singh made his professional debut for ATK Mohun Bagan in their Indian Super League match against Odisha. He came on as a 90th minute substitute for Manvir Singh as ATK Mohun Bagan won 4–1.

Career statistics

Club

References

External links
Profile at the All India Football Federation website
Profile at the Indian Super League website

2003 births
Living people
People from Manipur
Indian footballers
Association football midfielders
ATK Mohun Bagan FC players
Indian Super League players
Footballers from Manipur